Utica is a town in Hinds County, Mississippi, United States. The population was 820 at the 2010 census, down from 966 at the 2000 census. Utica is part of the Jackson Metropolitan Statistical Area.

History
Utica was originally an area known as Cane Ridge. In 1837, it was given the name Utica at the suggestion of the then postmaster, Ozias Osborn, who came from Utica, New York. The town was incorporated in 1880.

Utica was located on the Yazoo and Mississippi Valley Railroad. A weekly newspaper, the Herald, was established in 1897. In the early 1900s, Utica had several churches, eight hotels, a public school for white students, and an industrial college for black students. Agriculture consisted of watermelons, cotton and timber. The settlement had a sawmill, three cotton gins, and a brick plant. The population in 1907 was nearly 1,000.

Geography
Utica is in southwest Hinds County at the junctions of Mississippi Highways 18 and 27. Highway 18 leads northeast  to Jackson, the state capital, and southwest  to Port Gibson, while Highway 27 leads northwest  to Vicksburg and southeast  to Crystal Springs.

Climate
The climate in this area is characterized by relatively high temperatures and evenly distributed precipitation throughout the year. According to the Köppen Climate Classification system, Utica has a humid subtropical climate, abbreviated "Cfa" on climate maps.
<div style="width:65%">

</div style>

Demographics

2020 census

As of the 2020 United States census, there were 636 people, 337 households, and 199 families residing in the town.

2010 census
As of the 2010 United States Census, there were 820 people living in the town. The racial makeup of the town was 64.0% Black, 26.8% White, 0.1% Native American, 0.2% from some other race and 0.1% from two or more races. 8.7% were Hispanic or Latino of any race.

2000 census
As of the census of 2000, there were 966 people, 339 households, and 241 families living in the town. The population density was 323.0 people per square mile (124.7/km2). There were 397 housing units at an average density of 132.7 per square mile (51.3/km2). The racial makeup of the town was 30.54% White, 66.36% African American, 0.10% Native American, 0.31% Asian, 2.07% from other races, and 0.62% from two or more races. Hispanic or Latino of any race were 3.83% of the population.

There were 339 households, out of which 29.5% had children under the age of 18 living with them, 37.8% were married couples living together, 27.4% had a female householder with no husband present, and 28.9% were non-families. 26.0% of all households were made up of individuals, and 15.0% had someone living alone who was 65 years of age or older. The average household size was 2.85 and the average family size was 3.43.

In the town, the population was spread out, with 28.8% under the age of 18, 11.7% from 18 to 24, 24.8% from 25 to 44, 18.3% from 45 to 64, and 16.4% who were 65 years of age or older. The median age was 32 years. For every 100 females there were 94.4 males. For every 100 females age 18 and over, there were 85.9 males.

The median income for a household in the town was $27,614, and the median income for a family was $30,083. Males had a median income of $28,594 versus $21,932 for females. The per capita income for the town was $11,491. About 17.1% of families and 27.1% of the population were below the poverty line, including 37.1% of those under age 18 and 24.5% of those age 65 or over.

Religion and society
Utica is the location of the URJ Henry S. Jacobs Camp, organized by the Union for Reform Judaism and dating to when there were more Jews in smaller communities throughout the South. Most now live in larger urban areas with more professional opportunities.

The town is home to several churches of various denominations, including the following on Main Street: Utica Baptist Church (founded in 1829 and affiliated with the Southern Baptist Convention), Utica Christian Church (Disciples of Christ), Utica United Methodist Church, and St. Peter's Missionary Baptist Church, a black Baptist church founded in 1867 after the war by freedmen as a mission of the Baptist church. The black Baptists mostly withdrew en masse across the South from the white Baptist churches. They soon founded independent state associations of their congregations in the South, organizing a national convention by the end of the century. There are several other houses of worship in the town proper, as well as others in the county.

Education
Utica is served by the Hinds County School District, and is zoned to Utica Elementary-Middle School and Raymond High School in Raymond.

It is also the home of the Utica campus of Hinds Community College. Formerly Utica Junior College, the school was founded in 1903 as Utica Normal and Industrial Institute. It was previously home to Hinds County Agricultural High School.

Jackson/Hinds Library System operates the Evelyn Taylor Majure Library in Utica.

Notable people
 Woodrow Borah, historian
 Alonzo Bradley who played for Texas Southern University and who was the MVP of the 1977 NAIA basketball championship
 Zack Bragg, first mayor of West Memphis, Arkansas
 Charles H. Griffin, member of the United States House of Representatives from Mississippi's 3rd congressional district from 1968 to 1973
 William Henry Holtzclaw, educator and the founder of Utica Institute which became Hinds Community College
 Lindsey Hunter, professional basketball player and coach
 Robert Moreland, former basketball coach for Texas Southern
 Sonny Boy Nelson, Delta blues musician
 Derek Newton, offensive lineman for Houston Texans
 Pete Perry, former professional basketball player
 Willie Lee Simmons, former member of the Mississippi State Senate
 Marcell Young, professional football defensive back

References

Towns in Hinds County, Mississippi